Great Britain and Northern Ireland has participated in all the World Athletics Championships since the events beginning in 1983. The team is 7th on the all time medal table

Mo Farah is the most successful British Athlete in championships history, as well as the most successful distance runner in championships history with six gold and two silver medals split evenly between 5000 metres and 10,000 metres; only Usain bolt has won more individual gold medals than Farah. Jessica Ennis-Hill is the most successful British female athlete with three gold medals in heptathlon. Farah and Christine Ohuruogu, with two gold, a silver and five bronze medals are the most decorated British athletes in championships history with eight medals apiece. Great Britain's most successful event has been Heptathlon with four gold medals, and eight medals.

Medallists

Medal tables

By championships

Doping disqualification

See also
 Great Britain at the Olympics

References

Nations at the World Athletics Championships
World Championships